The 1932 United States Senate election in South Dakota took place on November 7, 1944. Incumbent Republican Senator Chan Gurney ran for re-election to a second term. He faced a strong challenge in the Republican primary from Lieutenant Governor A. C. Miller, who claimed that Gurney was too friendly to New Deal policies, but was defeated by Gurney by a wide margin. In the general election, Gurney faced former State Senator George M. Bradshaw, whom he defeated in a landslide as Thomas E. Dewey was decisively winning the state over President Franklin D. Roosevelt in the presidential election.

Democratic Primary
Former State Senator George M. Bradshaw was the only Democratic candidate to file for the U.S. Senate, removing the race from the ballot.

Republican Primary

Candidates
 Chan Gurney, incumbent U.S. Senator
 A. C. Miller, Lieutenant Governor of South Dakota

Results

General election

Results

References

South Dakota
1944
1944 South Dakota elections